Ángel Zaldívar Caviedes (born 8 February 1994) is a Mexican professional footballer who plays as a forward for Liga MX club Atlético San Luis, on loan from Guadalajara.

Club career

Guadalajara
Zaldívar made his official debut on 28 July 2013 in a home game against Querétaro F.C. He scored his first league goal in a match against Chiapas F.C. in which the team tied 1–1 in the last minute.

Coras (loan)
He was sent out on loan to Coras de Tepic in 2015 in order to gain playing time and experience.

Return to Guadalajara
On his return to Guadalajara he scored his first and second league goals against C.F. Pachuca which ended in a 4–4 draw. Zaldivar scored his 1st 2016 league goal and 4th professional goal with Guadalajara against Puebla to make the game 2–0 which the game ended in a 3–0 win for C.D. Guadalajara. He is a favorite when it comes to penalties, where his shooting abilities shine.

Monterrey (loan)
On January 1, 2019, it was announced that Zaldivar had joined Monterrey on loan for 1 year. On January 5, 2019, he made his debut in a 5–0 win against Pachuca he scored in the 84th minute.

Puebla (loan)
On January 3, 2020 Puebla announced that they had acquired Zaldivar for a 6-month loan.

Career statistics

Club

International

Honours
Guadalajara
Liga MX: Clausura 2017
Copa MX: Apertura 2015, Clausura 2017
Supercopa MX: 2016
CONCACAF Champions League: 2018

Monterrey
Liga MX: Apertura 2019
CONCACAF Champions League: 2019

Mexico Youth
Central American and Caribbean Games: 2014
Pan American Silver Medal: 2015

References

External links
http://www.chivasdecorazon.com.mx/jugadores/24/ngel-zaldvar-caviedes#.VS2hnvnF9T0

1994 births
Living people
Mexico international footballers
Mexican footballers
C.D. Guadalajara footballers
Coras de Nayarit F.C. footballers
C.F. Monterrey players
Club Puebla players
Liga MX players
Footballers from Guadalajara, Jalisco
Footballers at the 2015 Pan American Games
Pan American Games medalists in football
Pan American Games silver medalists for Mexico
Association football forwards
Medalists at the 2015 Pan American Games